The 2019 Singapore Premier League season was Tampines Rovers's 24th season at the top level of Singapore football and 74th year in existence as a football club. The club competed in the Singapore League Cup, Singapore Cup, Singapore Community Shield and the AFC Cup.

Tampines Rovers were second placed in the Singapore Premier League and won the Singapore Cup, defeating Warriors FC in a 3-4 victory. Tampines Rovers was equal in points with Hanoi FC at the top of the table at the group stage in the AFC Cup but was second placed due to a lower goal difference and failed to proceed beyond the group stage.

Squad

Sleague Squad

U19 Squad

Coaching staff

Transfers

Pre-season transfers

In

Note 1: Fazrul Nawaz returned to the team after the loan and subsequently complete the transfer to the cheetah despite signing a 3 years contract in 2018 .

Note 2: Afiq Yunos returned to the team after the loan and subsequently moved to Hougang United despite signing a 3 years contract in 2018.

Out

Note 1: Haikal Hasnol moves to Home United during his NS despite signing a 3 years contract in 2018 .

Note 2: Irfan Najeeb moves to Young Lions during his NS despite signing a 3 years contract in 2018 .

Retained

Extension

Promoted

Trial In

Trial Out

Mid-season transfers

Out

Friendlies

SPL Team

Pre-Season Friendly

Leo Cup 2019 Thailand - 18 to 25 January

U19 Team

Pre-Season Friendly

Team statistics

Appearances and goals

Note 1: Shah Shahiran scored an own goal in Singapore Premier League match against Albirex Niigata (S).

Hat-tricks 

Note
4 Player scored 4 goals
5 Player scored 5 goals

Competitions

Overview

Singapore Premier League

Singapore Cup

Group

Semi-final

Tampines Rovers won 4-1 on aggregate.

Final

AFC Cup

Group stage

Tampines Rovers End of Season Award Night

See also 
 2017 Tampines Rovers FC season
 2018 Tampines Rovers FC season

References

Tampines Rovers FC
Tampines Rovers FC seasons